The 1970 Asian Basketball Confederation Championship for Women were held in Kuala Lumpur, Malaysia.

Results

Final standing

Awards

Most Valuable Player:  Takeko Arakaki

References
 Results
 archive.fiba.com

1970
1970 in women's basketball
women
International women's basketball competitions hosted by Malaysia
B